Acalolepta variolaris is a species of beetle in the family Cerambycidae. It was described by Francis Polkinghorne Pascoe in 1866, originally under the genus Monochamus. It is known from Papua New Guinea.

References

Acalolepta
Beetles described in 1866